Fernando Andrés Cafasso (born 9 February 1983, in Jacinto Aráuz) is an Argentine former footballer, who played as a midfielder.

Career

Early career
Cafasso began his football at River Plate. Because he was not playing enough, he switched teams multiple times. He seemed to have finally found his place at Guaraní, but decided to move to Italy short after he signed for them.

Italy / Greece
Treviso was the first European team Caffaso played for. He then opted to move to Greece, at Ionikos, but did not earn a lot of matches here as well.

Gloria Bistrița
Before moving to Gloria, he had another failed spell at Guaraní. In Romania, Cafasso established himself as a key player very quickly. In spite of Gloria's relegation to Liga II, he chose not to leave the club and contributed to Gloria's promotion the following season. As of the 2012–13 season, he was chosen to be Gloria's captain by coach Nicolae Manea, thus becoming the first foreign captain in the club's history. He was released from Gloria in January 2013 when the club was put under administration.

References

External links
Fernando Cafasso at gazzetta.it

1983 births
Living people
People from Jacinto Aráuz
Argentine footballers
Argentine expatriate footballers
Club Atlético River Plate footballers
Newell's Old Boys footballers
Atlético Tucumán footballers
Tiro Federal footballers
Aldosivi footballers
Club Guaraní players
Treviso F.B.C. 1993 players
Ionikos F.C. players
ACF Gloria Bistrița players
Argentine Primera División players
Serie B players
Liga I players
Liga II players
Football League (Greece) players
Expatriate footballers in Paraguay
Expatriate footballers in Italy
Expatriate footballers in Greece
Expatriate footballers in Romania
Association football midfielders
Argentine expatriate sportspeople in Greece
Argentine expatriate sportspeople in Italy